Pomaderris costata is a species of flowering plant in the family Rhamnaceae and is endemic to south-eastern continental Australia. It is a spreading shrub with densely hairy branchlets, egg-shaped to elliptic leaves, and panicles of cream-coloured or white flowers.

Description
Flowering occurs in October and November and the fruit is a hairy capsule.

Taxonomy
Pomaderris costata was first formally described in 1951 by Norman Arthur Wakefield in The Victorian Naturalist from specimens he collected near the Brodribb River in 1947. The specific epithet (costata) means "ribbed".

Distribution and habitat
This pomaderris grows in open forest and shrubland, often in rocky places and is found in the far north-east of Victoria and the far south-east of New South Wales. It is rare in both states.

References

Flora of New South Wales
Flora of Victoria (Australia)
cinerea
Taxa named by Norman Arthur Wakefield
Plants described in 1951